Grangeopsis is a genus of flowering plants in the family Asteraceae.

Species
There is only one known species, Grangeopsis perrieri, an herb endemic to Madagascar.

Range and habitat
Grangeopsis perrieri is native to central and western Madagascar (former Antananarivo and Mahajanga provinces. It is known from four locations, and has an estimated area of occupancy of 36 km2. It grows in periodically-inundated areas at the edge of marshes between sea level and 1,340 meters elevation.

Conservation and threats
The species is threatened by habitat destruction from draining and development of wetlands, conversion to agriculture, and wildfire. Only one of the four known populations is in a protected area. Its conservation status is assessed as endangered.

References

Monotypic Asteraceae genera
Astereae
Endemic flora of Madagascar
Flora of the Madagascar dry deciduous forests
Flora of the Madagascar subhumid forests